Sushil Shrestha is Nepalese model and actor who works in Nepali cinema. He made his film debut with 2015 blockbuster film Hostel Returns which earned him Best new actor nomination in NFDC National Award. He then starred in Sunil Rawal's Saayad 2 , sequel of Saayad which is all set to release.

Shrestha was also participant to Manhunt International Nepal where he was able to grab title of Prostyle Best Hair.

Filmography

Awards

References

Living people
Actors from Kathmandu
Nepalese male actors
1992 births